Beauty Marks is the seventh studio album by American singer-songwriter Ciara. It was released on May 10, 2019, through her own independent label, Beauty Marks Entertainment with distribution from Alternative Distribution Alliance. It is her first album since Jackie (2015). The album was preceded by five singles "Level Up", "Freak Me", "Dose", "Greatest Love" and "Thinkin Bout You".

Upon release, Beauty Marks debuted at number 87 on the US Billboard 200, marking it Ciara's lowest charting album to date.

Background
After the release of her sixth studio album, Jackie (2015), Ciara decided to leave Epic Records in early 2016. Although the album spawned the Platinum-certified single, "I Bet", it failed to make much of a commercial impact, selling only around 160,000 copies worldwide within a three-month period. The singer had planned to further promote the album with a second leg of the Jackie Tour in March 2016, after postponing the dates from November 2015; however, on February 27, 2016, Ciara announced that the remaining dates of the tour had been cancelled and that she'd instead focus on recording her seventh studio album, while expressing that the album would see her undertaking a new musical direction.

On January 27, 2017, it was announced that Ciara had signed a new recording contract with Warner Bros. Records. As a part of the deal, Ciara began working on her seventh studio album and shot a music video for its lead single, "Level Up", in 2017. However, the Warner Records CEO didn't agree with the musical direction; as a result, Ciara's contract with the label was terminated and she was given the masters from the recording sessions for free.

In 2017, Ciara launched her own record and entertainment company, Beauty Marks Entertainment (BME); the venture was launched for her to follow her own creative direction and release her music on her own terms, with the singer eventually hoping to sign additional artists. BME's first endeavor was the release of the singles "Level Up", "Freak Me", and "Dose" in 2018, while Ciara officially announced its formation on February 7, 2019 at the MAKERS Conference.

On March 28, 2019, Ciara announced that her seventh studio album would be titled Beauty Marks after her label and that it would be released on May 10, 2019.  The album was made available for pre-order the following day, along with its fifth single, "Thinkin' Bout You". In speaking on the album's development process, Ciara expressed that she now feels as she did at the start of her career, stating:

Ciara revealed that she co-wrote the title track "Beauty Marks" with Skylar Grey.

Singles
"Level Up" was released via digital download and through streaming platforms on July 18, 2018 as the album's lead single, alongside a high-octane music video. The single peaked at 59 on the US Billboard Hot 100 and at 23 on the US Hot R&B/Hip-Hop Songs chart, while its music video inspired the viral "level up dance challenge". Ciara also challenged fans to share three ways that they hoped to "level up" in life in promotion of the single. The song was certified Platinum by the RIAA. With the success of "Level Up", Ciara released the album's second single, "Freak Me", featuring Nigerian rapper, Tekno, less than a month later on August 10, 2018. The single peaked at 22 on the US R&B/Hip-Hop Digital Songs Chart.

"Dose" was released as the album's third single on September 14, 2018, after premiering on ESPN’s Monday Night Football halftime show. The song's music video premiered on October 25, 2018 (Ciara's 33rd birthday). The single peaked at 7 on the US R&B Digital Songs Sales chart. The album's fourth single, "Greatest Love", was released alongside its music video on February 11, 2019, to coincide with Valentine's Day. The single peaked at 21 on the US R&B Digital Songs Sales chart.

"Thinkin Bout You" was released as the fifth single on March 29, 2019, along with the album's pre-order. Its music video premiered that same day. The single peaked at 20 on the US R&B/Hip-Hop Digital Songs Chart.

Ciara released a music video for the album's title track on May 11, 2019 and one for the album's third track, "Set", on June 14, 2019. Despite not being released as a single, the title track peaked at 22 on the R&B Digital Songs Sales chart.

Critical reception 

Beauty Marks received generally mixed reviews from music critics. At Metacritic, which assigns a normalized rating out of 100 to reviews from mainstream critics, the album received an average score of 57, based on 4 reviews. Andy Kellman, writing for AllMusic, noted that Ciara "retreads just about every move she has made before," and praised the ballads for  the ballads for "easily prevail[ing] over the up-tempo numbers, not one of which is a match for the singer's previous dancefloor conquests." In his Spin review, Alfred Soto called the album "mediocre", but remarked that "[it] manages to land in the middle of Ciara's discography when boldness is required." Nick Levine rated the album with 3 out of 5 stars, claiming that "[t]hough ‘Beauty Marks’ is rarely innovative, Ciara shows a respectable amount of range throughout the record. During his review for Pitchfork, Eric Torres perceived that "despite a handful of highlights, Beauty Marks is marred by filler, moving between frothy pop-R&B and stale empowerment anthems that leave Ciara's talents largely underused." In a more positive note, Steven J. Horowitz praised the album's themes of happiness and contentment, claiming that they "suit her well, as does her newfound openness. This is the Ciara that we deserve, and that she deserves too."

Commercial performance
The album debuted at number 87 on the US Billboard 200 and number 48 on the Top R&B/Hip-Hop Albums chart. As of May 2019, the album has sold over 135,000 equivalent album units globally.

Track listing
All songs were written by Ciara. Additional writers are noted below.

Notes
  signifies a vocal producer, this may be in addition to music production

Sample credits
"Level Up" contains a sample of the composition "Fuck It Up Challenge" by DJ Telly Tell, written by Telly Brown Jr.
"Freak Me" contains a sample of the composition "Before NKO" by Tiwa Savage,  written by Tiwatope Savage, Charles Enebeli and Michael Ajereh Collins.

Personnel
Credits for Beauty Marks adapted from Allmusic.

Studios

Recording locations

 Sphere Studios (London)  recording 
 Rocco's Castle  recording 
 Beauty Marks Studios  recording 
 Neptune Valley (Los Angeles)  recording 
 Space Primates Palace  recording 

Mixing locations

 Larrabee Sound Studios (North Hollywood)  mixing

Performers and Vocals

 Ciara – primary artist, vocals , background vocals 
 Macklemore – featured vocals 
 Kelly Rowland – featured vocals 
 Tekno – featured vocals 
 Missy Elliott – featured vocals 
 Fatman Scoop – featured vocals 
 Theron Thomas – background vocals 
 Marc Sibley – background vocals 
 Nathan Cunningham – background vocals 
 Carmen Reece – background vocals 
 Benny Cassette – synths 
 Kimberly Perry – wurltizer 
 Josh Lopez – guitar 
 J. R. Rotem – keyboard 
 Space Primates – instruments 
 Andy D.Park – instruments 
 Simone Vitucci – cello

Production

 Ciara – executive production, vocal production , A&R
 Monti Olson – A&R Partner
 Benny Cassette – production, vocal production 
 Tyler Dopps – vocal production 
 J.R. Rotem – production, vocal production 
 Moonbeat – production 
 Andy D. Park – vocal production 
 Space Primates – production 
 Brandon Green – production 
 Colby Green – vocal production 
 J. Pierre Medor – production 
 C. "Tricky" Stewart – production 
 Kelly Rowland – vocal production 
 Kyle Coleman – vocal production 
 Rodney "Darkchild" Jerkins – production 
 Jasper Cameron – production 
 Rod Cameron – production 
 Skylar Grey – production, vocal production 
 Eric Ross – vocal production

Technical

 Jacob Richards – engineering assistance 
 Rashawn McLean – engineering assistance 
 Mike Seaberg – engineering assistance 
 Benny Cassette – programming, engineering 
 Andy D. Park – engineering 
 Tyler Dopps – engineering 
 Jaycen Joshua – mixing 
 Samuel Kalandjian – engineering 
 Rodney Jenkins – mixing 
 Space Primates – programming, engineering 
 Chris Szczech – engineering 
 Kyle Coleman – engineering 
 Derek Keota – engineering 
 Joseph Hurtado – engineering 
 Manny Marroquin – mixing 
 Chris Athens – mastering

Artwork

 Sasha Samsonova – photography
 Dianne Garcia – styling
 Alejandra Hernandez – styling
 César DeLeön Ramirez – hair
 Yolanda Frederick-Thompson – make-up
 Miho Okawara – nails
 JP Robinson – art direction and design
 Stevie – art direction and design

Charts

Release history

Beauty Marks Tour

The Beauty Marks Tour was the fifth concert tour by American singer Ciara. The tour supported her seventh studio album, Beauty Marks.

Background
Ciara announced the tour on June 1, 2019, during a performance on Good Morning America.

Reception
Reviewing the Houston date for the Houston Chronicle, Joey Guerra said that "every song was a renewed blast of energy" and that regardless of whether she was singing her first hits or her newest songs, "it's still an intoxicating sound".

Tour dates

Set list
"Dose"
"Set"
"Goodies"
"That's Right"
"Get Up"
"Ride"
"Oh"
"Promise"
"And I"
"Sorry"
"I Bet"
"Like a Boy"
"Girl Gang"
"If"
"Freak Me"
"Ciara to the Stage"
"Like a Surgeon"
"Body Party"
"Thinkin Bout You"
"1, 2 Step"
"Tootsee Roll"
"Level Up"

References

2019 albums
Ciara albums
Albums produced by J. R. Rotem
Warner Records albums